War of God or Gwan Gung Vs Aliens is an 1976 Taiwanese-Hong Kong science fantasy film directed by Chen Hung-min and produced by Hsing Hua Film Production Company. Special effects coordinator Koichi Takano provided effects for the film.

Plot

Mr. Chao is an elderly blind sculptor who is building a statue depicting the mythological deity Guan Yu. When the statue is completed, a gigantic version of Guan Yu appears to fight giant Martians, who attacked Hong Kong, before he destroys them with his Green Dragon Crescent Blade.

Cast
 Yu Ming Lun as Chao Chun
 Tse Ling-Ling as Li Yu
 Cindy Tang Hsin as Chun Lan
 Yu-Hsin Chen as Mr. Chao
 Fei Lung as Guan Yu

References

External links
 

1970s fantasy films
1970s science fiction films
Science fantasy films
Taiwanese fantasy films
Taiwanese science fiction films
Hong Kong fantasy films
Hong Kong science fiction films
Films about artists
Mars in film
Alien invasions in films
Films set in Hong Kong
1970s Hong Kong films